Vue International (like "view"), is a multinational cinema holding company based in London, England. It operates in the United Kingdom and Ireland as Vue, with international operations in Denmark and Germany (as CinemaxX); Italy (as The Space Cinema); Poland and Lithuania (Multikino); Netherlands (Vue Netherlands);  Taiwan (SBC Cinemas).

History

Foundation

The company was founded in 1999 as Spean Bridge Cinemas by Stewart Blair, a former executive of United Artists Theatres and Tim Richards, a former executive of Warner Bros. International Theatres. It was named after a holiday to the Scottish Highland village of the same name by Blair.

2000s
The first cinema to open was under The Circuit Cinema brand in Livingston, Scotland, on 5 October 2000. The company was later renamed as SBC International Cinemas and opened cinemas in Faro, Portugal (closed in 2014) and Taipei, Taiwan (still operating as SBC).

In May 2003, SBC bought Warner Village Cinemas from its owners, Village Roadshow and Warner Bros., for £250 million. At the time, SBC owned four cinemas, and Warner Village Cinemas owned 36. In April 2005, the chain acquired the Ster Century chain from Aurora Entertainment; this included the highest grossing cinema in the United Kingdom or Ireland at Liffey Valley Shopping Centre in Dublin, Ireland.

On 20 June 2006, Vue's executive team completed a management buy out of the company with the backing of Bank of Scotland Corporate; the management team retaining a 51% stake. Also, as part of the buy out, Vue took full ownership of the four Village sites it had been operating under contract from Village Roadshow. The private equity firm Doughty Hanson & Co acquired Vue in November 2010.

2010s
Vue bought the company Apollo in May 2012, retaining 14 new sites across the United Kingdom, making it the third largest cinema company in the United Kingdom, behind Odeon and Cineworld.

In May 2013, Vue Entertainment acquired Multikino, the Polish cinema operator owning thirty cinemas with almost 250 screens in Poland and Baltic countries.

In June 2013, Doughty Hanson & Co announced it had sold Vue to the Canadian pension funds Alberta Investment Management Corporation and OMERS for £935 million.

In November 2014, Vue International acquired The Space Cinema in Italy.

In March 2015, Vue announced it would built the United Kingdom's first eSports arena in cooperation with Gfinity, costing £350,000. The Fulham Broadway cinema was converted into a six hundred seat 'Gfinity Arena,' to host e gaming events 

In August 2015, Vue International acquired JT Bioscopen, the second largest cinema chain in the Netherlands, bringing Vue's number of sites to over 200.

In June 2018, Vue acquired the Irish operator Showtime Cinemas, adding a further two cinemas to their estate in the United Kingdom and Ireland, now totalling 89 cinemas.

2020–present
In March 2020, Vue temporarily closed its cinemas due to the COVID-19 pandemic, stating that it would "remain closed until further notice". Though numerous lockdowns affected a brief reopening in mid 2020, eventually, all cinemas reopened in May 2021, with COVID restrictions in force until spring 2022.

On 18 May 2020, Vue announced that it would close its single Multikino site in Riga, Latvia, after operating for almost 10 years.

Locations
Vue International operates over 200 sites with almost 2,000 screens globally.

References

External links

 
 Vue International Bidco PLC on Bloomberg L.P.

Cinema chains in the United Kingdom
Cinema chains in the Republic of Ireland
British companies established in 1999
Entertainment companies established in 1999
2010 mergers and acquisitions
2013 mergers and acquisitions
1999 establishments in England